Alison Gregorka (born June 29, 1985) is an American water polo player. She started playing at the age of 14. She was a member of the US water polo team that won a silver medal at the 2008 Beijing Olympics. She is now coaching high school water polo in Lake Oswego, Oregon. She also appeared on the show Wipeout on ABC during the winter version of the show.

Career
Gregorka played NCAA women's water polo at Stanford University.

In June 2009, Gregorka was named to the USA water polo women's senior national team for the 2009 FINA World Championships.

Gregorka also made an appearance on ABC's Winter Wipeout, Season 4, Episode 1, where she won a $1,000 bonus for remaining on "The Ski Lift" the longest. She was eliminated in the third challenge, "Seven Letter Word". She returned with past "Summer Wipeout" winner from Season 4, Episode 19, Sarah Cooper, as partners on Season 5, Episode 10. This was an episode for returning wipeout competitors, winners and losers, that team up together. Gregorka and Cooper, however, failed to complete the second challenge, "The Hangover", but both managed to walk away with $500 when Gregorka tagged the show's mascot, Smallsy, on the Big Balls.

See also
 List of Olympic medalists in water polo (women)
 List of world champions in women's water polo
 List of World Aquatics Championships medalists in water polo

References

External links
 

1985 births
Living people
American female water polo players
Water polo players at the 2008 Summer Olympics
Olympic silver medalists for the United States in water polo
Stanford Cardinal women's water polo players
American people of Ukrainian descent
Medalists at the 2008 Summer Olympics
World Aquatics Championships medalists in water polo
American water polo coaches
Sportspeople from Ann Arbor, Michigan
21st-century American women
20th-century American women